Jason R. Ryznar (born February 19, 1983) is an American former professional ice hockey player.

Playing career
Typically playing as a left winger, Ryznar was selected by the New Jersey Devils as the 64th choice (third round) of the 2002 NHL Entry Draft.

Rynzar played for the United States Junior National Team in 2000 and 2001 before heading to the University of Michigan where he would play for four seasons, growing in stature as a checking line player.

In 2005–06, Ryznar played with the Albany River Rats of the American Hockey League, the Devils minor-league affiliate.

In January 2005, he was called up by the Devils - due to injuries and suspensions - and played sparingly as a fourth-liner. His call-up as a first-year pro was a rarity for the normally deep and methodical New Jersey Devils.

After the 2007–08 season, Ryznar wasn't offered a contract by the Devils and was invited to the Minnesota Wild training camp on September 18, 2008. Ryznar was then sent on a try-out to affiliate,  Houston Aeros, on September 28, 2008. Ryznar made the Aeros opening night roster for the 2008–09 season.

Career statistics

Regular season and playoffs

International

References

External links

1983 births
Living people
Albany River Rats players
American men's ice hockey left wingers
Houston Aeros (1994–2013) players
Ice hockey people from Anchorage, Alaska
Lowell Devils players
Michigan Wolverines men's ice hockey players
New Jersey Devils draft picks
New Jersey Devils players